Barwadih Junction, station code BRWD, is the railway station serving the city of Barwadih which is the connecting point of Latehar and Palamu districts. Barwadih Junction belongs to the Eastern Central Railway zone of the Indian Railways. Barwadih is surrounded by hills.

History
This is one of the junctions connecting Latehar and Palamu districts of Jharkhand. The Railway Ministry plans to build a new  km line between Ambikapur (Chhattisgarh) and Barwadih (Jharkhand).

Britishers were the first to moot the proposal way back in 1925 to connect Ambikapur and Barwadih, both coal-rich areas, by rail. The plan was aimed to facilitate the transportation of minerals.

The Britishers knew the importance of the rail line and the work on the project was started in the early 1930s after conducting the survey, sources added. The required land for the project was also acquired. But the work was stopped during World War II and the project had been pending since then, sources said.

The new rail line will give connectivity from Howrah, Dhanbad & Ranchi to Mumbai via  Lohardaga, Barkakana, Latehar, Barwadih, Ambikapur, Katni, Jabalpur & Itarsi. It would help reducing the rail distance between the two Metros. At present, both the Metros are connected by two different rail routes one via Nagpur & Bilaspur and another via Itarsi & Jabalpur.

The railway runs maximum trains between both the Metros via Nagpur–Bilaspur section. Besides a daily Kolkata mail, a couple of weekly trains chug on Jabalpur–Itarsi section.

Sources said that the new  Barwadih–Ambikapur line would change the rail map route between Howrah and Mumbai.

Facilities 
The major facilities available are waiting rooms, retiring room, computerized reservation facility, reservation counter, vehicle parking, etc.

Platforms
The platforms are interconnected with foot overbridge (FOB).

Trains 
Several electrified local passenger trains also run from Barwadih to neighbouring destinations on frequent intervals.

Nearest airports
The nearest airports to Barwadih Station are:
 Birsa Munda Airport, Ranchi  
 Gaya Airport, Gaya 
 Lok Nayak Jayaprakash Airport, Patna 
 Netaji Subhash Chandra Bose International Airport, Kolkata

See also 
 Barwadih
 Latehar
 Palamu

References

External links 
 Latehar District
Arrivals at Barwadih Junction Railway Station

Railway stations in Latehar district
Railway junction stations in Jharkhand